Aleksandr Sergeyevich Smirnov (born 6 June 1982) is a former Russian professional football player.

Club career
He played 2 seasons in the Russian Football National League for FC Khimki and FC Spartak-MZhK Ryazan.

External links
 
 

1982 births
Living people
Russian footballers
Association football midfielders
FC Khimki players
FC Asmaral Moscow players
FC Lada-Tolyatti players
FC Sokol Saratov players
FC Spartak-MZhK Ryazan players